Mahidharpura is an area located in Surat, Gujarat, India. It is famous for Ganesh Chaturthi, an Indian festival. During Ganesh Chaturthi, there are several different, unique and creative types of murti of Ganpati Bappa. Many people visit here to see different type of murtis of Ganpati Bappa and most of the people residing here(in Mahidharpura) place stalls of food, snacks, handicrafts, and many different handmade artistic things and thus it is like a fun-fair during Ganesh Chaturthi.

See also 
List of tourist attractions in Surat

Suburban area of Surat
Neighbourhoods in Surat